Donald Keith may refer to:

 Donald Keith (author), a pseudonym for authors Donald and Keith Monroe
 Donald Keith (actor) (1903–1969), American silent film actor
 Donald R. Keith (1927–2004), American Army general